The Croatian Football Federation (HNS) is the national governing body of football in Croatia. It was originally formed in 1912 and is based in the capital city of Zagreb. The organisation is a member of both FIFA and UEFA, and is responsible for overseeing all aspects of the game of football in Croatia. The current president of HNS is Marijan Kustić.

The HNS sanctions all competitive football matches in Croatia, beginning with the HNL on down to 3. NL, as well as the Croatian Cup, while low-tiered leagues are sanctioned by inter-county and county associations. It is also responsible for appointing the management of the men's, women's and youth national football teams. As of 2009, the HNS had 118,316 registered players (650 of them professionals) and a total of 1,732 registered association football and futsal clubs.

History

Early years (1912–1945)
The organisation traces its roots to the Croatian Sports Federation (Hrvatski športski savez), which was founded on 8 October 1909 in Zagreb, at the time when Croatia was part of Austria-Hungary. The federation organised all sports in the country and its first president was Hinko Würth, the chairman of HAŠK football club. Present-day HNS considers its foundation date to be 13 June 1912, when the football section of the Croatian Sports Federation was established, and its head, Milovan Zoričić, as its first president.

After World War I and the dissolution of Austria-Hungary, representatives from Građanski, HAŠK, Hajduk Split and Concordia football clubs met in Zagreb on 14 April 1919 and founded the Football Association of Yugoslavia (Jugoslavenski nogometni savez), as a successor of the Croatian Sports Federation's football section, and appointed Hinko Würth as its president. The organization then became the chief governing body of football in the Kingdom of Yugoslavia and launched the Yugoslav First League, the first country-wide national competition held initially in a cup format. Five other regional sub-federations were also created (based in Belgrade, Ljubljana, Sarajevo, Split and Subotica), each organizing their own regional tournament with winners qualifying for the national championship.

In 1929, following disagreements between the Zagreb and Belgrade sub-federations, the Football Association of Yugoslavia was dissolved. It was then re-established in May 1930 in Belgrade, this time with the Serbian-language name Fudbalski savez Jugoslavije. The Belgrade-based association then continued organizing the national league until 1939, when the Banovina of Croatia was created as an administrative region within Kingdom of Yugoslavia. On 6 August 1939 the Croatian Football Federation (Hrvatski nogometni savez or HNS) was established as a football governing body in the newly created province, and Croatian and Slovenian clubs soon began leaving the Yugoslav League to join the HNS-run Croatian-Slovenian Football League in protest of the alleged centralization of sports around Belgrade. The split was eventually rectified with the promise of an increase in the number of Croatian and Slovenian  clubs in the league, and because of this a shortened ten-round league was played in the 1939–40 Yugoslav First League season. In 1940 HNS also played a part in organizing the first ever Croatia national football team matches which played four international friendlies between April and December 1940. However the federation was not yet recognized by FIFA as Croatia was at the time still a province of Yugoslavia.

In April 1941 Kingdom of Yugoslavia was invaded by Axis Powers and was effectively dissolved. However, the Croatian Football Federation continued to run a competition called the Croatian national football league in the territory of Independent State of Croatia (NDH), a fascist puppet state which enjoyed relative peace during World War II, and which included most of present-day countries of Croatia and Bosnia and Herzegovina. On 17 July 1941 HNS was admitted to FIFA as the top level federation of NDH, and the national team representing NDH played fourteen international matches in the period from 1941 to 1944.

HNS in Yugoslavia (1945–1990)

Following the end of World War II, Croatia became a part of SFR Yugoslavia and the Belgrade-based Football Association of Yugoslavia took over as the main football-governing body in the country. Also, the new communist government issued a decree in 1945 which effectively dissolved all football clubs which were active during the war as a form of punishment for their participation in the fascist-run football championship. Among others, Zagreb-based powerhouses Concordia, HAŠK and Građanski all ceased to exist, their property was nationalised, and several other clubs, most notably Dinamo Zagreb, were formed to take their place. On the other hand, Hajduk Split was spared as their players had escaped from their Italian-occupied home city of Split during World War II and joined Yugoslav Partisans in 1944. For this reason, Hajduk Split is the only major Croatian club which can claim continuity since its foundation in 1911.

In the period from 1945 to 1990 the Belgrade-based Yugoslav Football Federation was in charge of football in the entire country, while Zagreb was turned into its major regional hub and administrative branch. In this period Croatian clubs competed within the Yugoslav league system and Croatian players were eligible for the Yugoslavia national football team. In the following decades Dinamo Zagreb and Hajduk Split became two of the Yugoslav Big Four (along with Belgrade-based Partizan and Red Star), a quartet of clubs which significantly dominated football in communist Yugoslavia. Dinamo and Hajduk won a combined total of 11 Yugoslav First League titles and 16 Yugoslav Cup. In addition, Croatian club Rijeka won 2 Yugoslav Cup titles. Dinamo Zagreb also won the 1966–67 Inter-Cities Fairs Cup, which made them the first Yugoslav side to win a continental competition, and were the only Yugoslav club with European silverware until Red Star's 1990–91 European Cup win 24 years later.

Modern era (1990–present)
When the breakup of Yugoslavia began to unfold in the early 1990s, the political situation was reflected on football pitches. On 13 May 1990 an infamous riot occurred at Maksimir in Zagreb and interrupted the Dinamo Zagreb – Red Star league fixture. On 3 June 1990 the pre-scheduled Yugoslavia–Netherlands friendly was held at the same stadium, and some 20,000 Croatian fans booed the Yugoslav national anthem and cheered for the Dutch team instead. On 26 September 1990 Hajduk Split fans staged a violent pitch invasion at Poljud during a league fixture against Partizan. On 17 October 1990 the first match of the newly established Croatia national football team was held, a friendly against the United States, and following the end of the 1990–91 season Croatian clubs decided to abandon Yugoslav competitions.

After Croatia had officially declared independence on 8 October 1991, the Croatian Football Federation sought international recognition, and was finally re-admitted to FIFA on 3 July 1992 and to UEFA on 17 June 1993.

In February 1992 the inaugural season of the Croatian top league Prva HNL kicked off, and in March 1992 the first edition of the Croatian Cup was launched.

In late 2010, the Federation held an election for its President, with Vlatko Marković opposed by Igor Štimac. Marković won by a single vote, and the assembly was marred with controversies. Štimac later appealed, calling for another meeting of the Federation. His supporters organized a new assembly and elected him the new President despite the opposing faction's boycott, leading to an impasse.

In July 2012, the Federation held an election for its President, with Davor Šuker as the only candidate. All 46 delegates voted in favour of Suker's candidature.

Presidents
Notes
 The first three presidents 1912–1919 were heads of football sections within the Croatian Sports Federation, the top sports governing body in Croatia, which was at the time a province within Austria-Hungary. Following World War I and the formation of the Kingdom of Yugoslavia the organisation was re-established in Zagreb in 1919 as the Football Association of Yugoslavia and designed as a national-level governing body. Its seat was moved to Yugoslavia's capital Belgrade ten years later in 1929. Although city-level subfederations continued to exist in the 1920s and 1930s there was no separate regional organisation which would govern the sport in Croatia between 1919 and 1939, hence the 20-year gap. 
 In 1939 the Banovina of Croatia was created as an autonomous province within Yugoslavia, and a new provincial federation carrying the present-day football federation's name was established. Ivo Kraljević headed this body between 1939 and 1941. 
 Following the April 1941 invasion of Yugoslavia the Independent State of Croatia (NDH), an Axis-allied puppet state which included most of the territories of present-day Croatia and Bosnia and Herzegovina, was established. The Zagreb-based football federation thus began to govern football in the entire territory of NDH and continued to organize national-level league championship during World War II. During this period NDH was admitted to FIFA and organised 14 international friendlies involving Croatia. Presidents between 1941 and 1945 headed the HNS during this era.
 After 1945 and the establishment of the communist SFR Yugoslavia, the HNS again became one of its regional federations, charged with governing football in SR Croatia, which became one of Yugoslavia's six federal republics. Presidents from 1945–1990 headed the HNS in this period.
 After Croatia proclaimed independence in 1991 and the breakup of Yugoslavia the HNS became the top football governing body of the newly independent nations. The country was internationally recognized by early 1992, and HNS was admitted to FIFA (again) in July 1992 and to UEFA in June 1993.

List of presidents (1912–1990)

 Milovan Zoričić (1912–1914)
 Vladimir Očić (1914)
 Milan Graf (1914–1919)
 Ivo Kraljević (1939–1941)
 Rudolf Hitrec (1941–1942)
 Vatroslav Petek (1942–1944)
 Rinaldo Čulić (1944–1945)
 Mijo Hršak (1945–1947)

 Lazo Vračarić (1947–1950)
 Boris Bakrač (1950–1953)
 Vlado Ranogajec (1953–1957)
 Mirko Oklobdžija (1957–1959)
 Pero Splivalo (1959–1965)
 Luka Bajakić (1965–1966)
 Bruno Knežević (1966–1971)
 Ivan Kolić (1971–1976)

 Vlado Bogatec (1976–1978)
 Ljubo Španjol (1978–1981)
 Željko Huber (1981–1982)
 Dušan Veselinović (1982–1984)
 Milivoj Ražov (1984–1985)
 Adam Sušanj (1985–1986)
 Antun Ćilić (1986–1988)
 Paško Viđak (1988–1990)

List of presidents (1990–present)

 Mladen Vedriš (September 1990 – July 1994)
 Damir Matovinović (acting; 8 July 1994 – 10 March 1995)
 Đuro Brodarac (10 March 1995 – 8 June 1995)
 Nadan Vidošević (8 June 1995 – 17 August 1996)

 Josip Šoić (17 August 1996 – 2 June 1997)
 Branko Mikša (2 June 1997 – 5 October 1998)
 Vlatko Marković (18 December 1998 – 5 July 2012)
 Davor Šuker (5 July 2012 – 29 July 2021)
 Marijan Kustić (29 July 2021 – present)

Competitions

It organizes the following competitions:
Men's football
 HNL; First league
 1. NL (or Prva NL); Second league
 2. NL (or Druga NL); Third league
 3. NL (or Treća NL): Fourth league
 Croatian Football Cup
 Croatian Football Super Cup

Women's football
 1. HNLŽ (or Prva HNL za žene); First Women's Division
 2. HNLŽ (or Druga HNL za žene); Second Women's Division
 Croatian Women's Cup

Youth football
 1. HNL Academy; First league for academy sides, with three age categories for boys: Under 19 (Juniori), Under 17 (Kadeti) and Under 15 (Pioniri), and two for girls Under 17 (Kadetkinje) and Under 15 (Pionirke).

Futsal
 1. HMNL (or Prva HMNL): First league
 2. HMNL (or Druga HMNL): Second league
 1. HMNLŽ (or Prva HMNLŽ): First women's league

Beach Soccer
 1. HNLP (or Prva HNLP)

National teams
The Croatian Football Federation also organises national football teams representing Croatia at all age levels:
Men's
 Croatia national football team (currently managed by Zlatko Dalić)
 Croatia U21 national football team (currently managed by Igor Bišćan)
 Croatia U20 national football team (currently managed by Ognjen Vukojević)
 Croatia U19 national football team (currently managed by Josip Šimunić)
 Croatia U18 national football team (currently managed by Josip Šimunić)
 Croatia U17 national football team (currently managed by Tomislav Rukavina)
 Croatia U16 national football team (currently managed by Tomislav Rukavina)
 Croatia U15 national football team (currently managed by Sergej Milivojević)

Women's
 Croatia women's national football team (currently managed by Nenad Gračan)
 Croatia women's U19 national football team (currently managed by Božidar Miletić)
 Croatia women's U17 national football team (currently managed by Stella Gotal)
 Croatia women's U15 national football team (currently managed by Božidar Miletić)

Futsal
 Croatia national futsal team (currently managed by Marinko Mavrović)
 Croatia U19 national futsal team (currently managed by Duje Maretić)
 Croatia women's national futsal team (currently managed by Luka Marinović)

Beach soccer
 Croatia beach soccer national team (currently managed by Emanuel Melon)

References

External links
 Official website 
  Croatia at FIFA.com
  Croatia at UEFA.com

Croatia
Football in Croatia
Futsal in Croatia
Football
Sports organizations established in 1912
1912 establishments in Austria-Hungary